Ruaidhrí Gilla Dubh Ó Seachnasaigh (died 1569) was an Irish Knight and Chief of the Name. He is known in English as Sir Roger O'Shaughnessy. 

The son of Sir Diarmaid Ó Seachnasaigh, Ruaidhrí was described by Sir Henry Sidney as "a very obedient and civil man, and most desirous to hold his lands directly of your majesty and to be delivered of the exactions of both the earls of Clanricarde and Thomond", whose earldoms lay north and south of O'Shaughnessy's small lordship. 

The oppressions of Burke and O'Brien had led to his father consenting to the policy of surrender and regrant, by which means Sir Roger hoped to preserve his estates for his descendants. They were successfully confirmed in law by the Composition of Connacht of 1585. One of his last known male-line descendants, and Ó Seachnasaigh chief of the name, was Major-General William O'Shaughnessy (1673–1744). The last Ó Seachnasaigh chief, Joseph, died in 1783. 

He married Lady Honora O'Brien, daughter of Murrough O'Brien, 1st Earl of Thomond.

References

 D'Alton, John, Illustrations, Historical and Genealogical, of King James's Irish Army List (1689). Dublin: 1st edition (single volume), 1855. pp. 328–32.
 History of Galway, James Hardiman, 1820
 Tabular pedigrees of O'Shaughnessy of Gort (1543–1783), Martin J. Blake, Journal of the Galway Archaeological and Historical Society, vi (1909–10), p. 64; vii (1911–12), p. 53.
 John O'Donovan. The Genealogies, Tribes, and Customs of Hy-Fiachrach. Dublin: Irish Archaeological Society. 1844. Pedigree of O'Shaughnessy: pp. 372–91.
 Old Galway, Professor Mary Donovan O'Sullivan, 1942
 Galway: Town and Gown, edited Moran et al., 1984
 Galway: History and Society, 1996
 William O Shaughnessy: Some Glimpses of Major-General William O Shaughnessy (1673–1744) Eoghan Ó hAnnrachain, Journal of the Galway Archaeological and Historical Society, pp. 23–32, volume 58, 2006.

People from County Galway
Ruaidhri Gilla Dubh
16th-century Irish people
1569 deaths
Irish lords
Year of birth unknown